Michelle Beisner-Buck (born October 15, 1976) is a former National Football League (NFL) cheerleader, dancer, actress, and currently a reporter for ESPN, doing feature reports for Monday Night Football and its pregame show Monday Night Countdown.

Prior to joining ESPN, she was an NFL Network personality - hosting NFL Weekly Countdown and NFL Network Now, and served as a field reporter for NFL Total Access and NFL GameDay Morning.

Before becoming a media personality, Beisner-Buck was a cheerleader for the NFL's Denver Broncos.

Career
Prior to her work with NFL Network, Beisner-Buck served as a pit reporter for the Champ Car World Series on ESPN, host of "The Turbo Tour", on the Speed Channel, worked as a feature/field reporter for "The Best Damn Sports Show", host of the “Grand Prix” of Denver, co-host of "The Vista" on Altitude Network, and entertainment emcee for the Denver Nuggets, Colorado Avalanche, and the Colorado Mammoth.  She has worked in various reporting capacities for Fox Sports Net, Comcast, Speed Channel, ESPN, CBS, NBC and ABC.

Beisner-Buck has also acted in the feature films Any Given Sunday, Throttle, and Alice and Wasteland.

Before working in film and television, Beisner-Buck had 15 years of dance training, and was a member of the Denver Broncos cheerleaders, serving as squad captain for four years of her six year tenure. Beisner-Buck was the Pro Bowl representative in 1999, and traveled to such places like Canada, South America, Hong Kong, and Australia, performing and teaching dance. Beisner-Buck was part of the USO tour in Iraq and Africa, where she emceed and danced for the American troops. Beisner-Buck also co-created, produced, sang/danced, and starred in "Dollhouse Revue", a Denver-based burlesque show featuring former Broncos cheerleaders.

Personal life
She married Fox Sports announcer Joe Buck on April 14, 2014.  They have twin boys, Blake and Wyatt, born in April 2018. Joe later joined Michelle at ESPN in 2022.

References

External links

1976 births
Living people
American cheerleaders
American television reporters and correspondents
American television sports announcers
National Football League cheerleaders
National Football League announcers
Women sports announcers
Place of birth missing (living people)
American women television journalists
21st-century American women